Kelly Green may refer to:

 Kelly green, a shade of green
 Kelly Green (musician) (born 1947), Australian singer
 Kelly Green (comics), a comics series by Leonard Starr and Stan Drake

See also
Kelly Greene (fl. 2010s–2020s), Canadian politician